Ramón María Calderé del Rey (born 16 January 1959) is a Spanish former professional footballer who played as a midfielder, currently a manager.

An all-around midfield unit, he played mainly for Barcelona, appearing in 157 competitive games over four La Liga seasons. In the Spanish top division, he also represented Valladolid and Betis.

A Spanish international in the second part of the 80s, Calderé represented the country at the 1986 World Cup and Euro 1988. He went on to have an extensive career as a coach following his retirement, but exclusively in the lower leagues.

Club career
Born in Vila-rodona, Tarragona, Catalonia, Calderé was a product of local club FC Barcelona's youth system, having spent several seasons with their reserves. In an unassuming loan spell, he made his La Liga debut with Real Valladolid in 1980–81.

At already 25, Calderé was promoted to the first team, helping them win the league title in his first season even though he was not first choice. In summer 1988, he signed for fellow top-flight Real Betis against his wishes, being relegated in his debut campaign.

Calderé retired in 1993 at the age of 34, with lowly UE Sant Andreu also in his province of birth, and subsequently took up coaching, mainly with modest teams in the region: CE Premià – twice – UE Cornellà, CF Gavà, UE Castelldefels, CF Badalona, AD Ceuta, CF Reus Deportiu, CD Teruel, CF Palencia and Burgos CF. In June 2008, whilst a manager of Reus, he was arrested following an alleged assault on a civil guard during a match at Sangonera Atlético CF.

Other than working in his country's lower leagues, Calderé also had a brief assistant spell at Sint-Truidense V.V. in the Belgian First Division A, under his compatriot Tintín Márquez.

International career
Calderé earned 18 caps and scored seven goals for Spain, and played in the 1986 FIFA World Cup where he scored twice in a 3–0 group stage win over Algeria. Having made his debut on 30 April 1985 in a 1986 World Cup qualifier against Wales in Wrexham (3–0 loss), he was also picked for UEFA Euro 1988's squad, but was not used.

Calderé was used as an overaged player by the under-21 side, helping them win the 1986 European Championships even though he did not appear in the finals due to injury.

1986 World Cup
During the 1986 World Cup in Mexico, Calderé suffered from a case of travelers' diarrhea, and was prescribed antibiotics by the national team physician. After the win against Northern Ireland he was summoned for a doping test, which came out positive.

Calderé, however, was not sanctioned, as the medical staff argued successfully the medication was administered to fight the condition, lest a severe risk of dehydration. He scored twice against Algeria in the following match.

Managerial statistics

Honours

Player
Barcelona
La Liga: 1984–85
Copa del Rey: 1987–88
Copa de la Liga: 1986

Sant Andreu
Segunda División B: 1991–92

Manager
Gavà
Tercera División: 2000–01

Teruel
Tercera División: 2009–10

Castellón
Tercera División: 2014–15

References

External links

1959 births
Living people
People from Alt Camp
Sportspeople from the Province of Tarragona
Spanish footballers
Footballers from Catalonia
Association football midfielders
La Liga players
Segunda División players
Segunda División B players
FC Barcelona Atlètic players
RSD Alcalá players
Real Valladolid players
FC Barcelona players
Real Betis players
UE Sant Andreu footballers
Spain under-21 international footballers
Spain international footballers
1986 FIFA World Cup players
UEFA Euro 1988 players
Spanish football managers
Segunda División B managers
Tercera División managers
UE Cornellà managers
CF Badalona managers
AD Ceuta managers
CF Reus Deportiu managers
Burgos CF managers
CD Castellón managers
Spanish expatriate sportspeople in Belgium